Mujia Township is a township in Lancang Lahu Autonomous County, Yunnan, China.

Etymology
"Mujia" is a Tai Nuea language name, which means "place like a spoon", written in Tai Le script as ᥛᥫᥒᥰ ᥐᥣᥐᥱ. The original pronunciation is "Mengga", but now evolved to "Mujia". Another said, "Mujia" is a Wa language name, which means "place with many of wild ginger", and written in Wa language as "ndaex glag".

Administrative division
As of 2016, the township is divided into six villages:

 Bangli
 Mengnuo
 Haboma
 Laba
 Nanliu
 Fujiao

Geography
The township is situated at northwestern Lancang Lahu Autonomous County. The township shares a border with Xuelin Wa Ethnic Township to the west, Shangyun Town and Fubang Township to the east, Ankang Wa Ethnic Township to the north, and Zhutang Township to the south.

There are four major streams in the township, namely the Nanjia Stream, Napi Stream, Nanla Stream, and Waluoma Stream. They are tributaries of the Black River.

Economy
The economy of the township is largest based on agriculture, including farming and pig-breeding. The main crops of the region are grain, followed by corn and wheat. Commercial crops include tea and beans.

Demographics

As of 2017, the National Bureau of Statistics of China estimates the township's population now to be 16,113.

Transportation
The National Highway G214 passes across the township.

References

Citations

General bibliography 
 

Divisions of Lancang Lahu Autonomous County
Townships of Pu'er City